Dennis Cakebread (born 1938), is a male former athlete who competed for England.

Athletics career
He represented England in the long jump at the 1958 British Empire and Commonwealth Games in Cardiff, Wales. In 1960 he joined the Royal Air Force for his 2 years National Service, serving as an Accounts Clerk. He performed his basic training at RAF Bridgenorth and Technical Training at RAF Cranwell. He continued his sporting activity by representing the Royal Air Force at both Triple Jump and Long Jump against the Army and Royal Navy in the Inter-Services Athletic Championships before going on to represent the Combined Services against the Amateur Athletic Association.

References

1938 births
English male long jumpers
Athletes (track and field) at the 1958 British Empire and Commonwealth Games
Living people
Commonwealth Games competitors for England